Phaeotrichoconis crotalariae is an ascomycete fungus that is a plant pathogen. In Brazil, it has been found growing as an endophyte on the healthy leaves of fox grape (Vitis labrusca).

See also 
 List of foliage plant diseases (Palmae)

References 

Ascomycota enigmatic taxa
Fungi described in 1954
Fungi of South America
Fungal plant pathogens and diseases
Palm diseases